Thursday is an unincorporated community located in Ritchie County, West Virginia, United States. It is near the community of Burnt House.

The community's name origin specifically related to the date of a post office application, which was Thursday. The Post Office  was established in 1921 and no longer exists.

Gallery

References 

Unincorporated communities in West Virginia
Unincorporated communities in Ritchie County, West Virginia